Cycas yorkiana is a species of cycad found in Australia. It is native to Queensland, where it is confined to the Cape York Peninsula.

References

yorkiana
Endemic flora of Queensland